This is a list of British television related events from 1969.

Events

January
3 January – ITV Granada exclusively begins showing the American cartoon series Spider-Man long before any other ITV regions.
4 January – Guitarist Jimi Hendrix causes complaints of arrogance from television producers after playing an impromptu version of Sunshine Of Your Love past his allotted timeslot on the BBC1 show Happening for Lulu.

February
No events.

March
19 March – The 385 metre tall Emley Moor transmitting station mast collapses because of icing.
29 March – The UK shares the win of the 14th Eurovision Song Contest, in a four-way tie with France, Spain, and the Netherlands. Lulu represents the UK, singing Boom Bang-a-Bang.
31 March – Charles Curran becomes Director-General of the BBC. That same day, The Flashing Blade airs on BBC1 for the very first time, transmitted in Black & White.

April
14 April – The hugely popular and long-running comedy series The Liver Birds debuts on BBC1.  The Liverpool set series was created by Carla Lane, it would run for over a decade with a brief revival in 1996.

May
No events.

June
21 June 
Patrick Troughton makes his last regular appearance as the Second Doctor in the concluding moments of Episode 10 of the Doctor Who serial The War Games. It also marks the final time that the series is broadcast in black and white.
The documentary Royal Family is broadcast which attracts more than 30.6 million viewers, an all-time British record for a non-current event programme.
 June – Anglia Television and Yorkshire Television begin talks regarding a cost-cutting exercise which would involve sharing equipment and facilities. Neither company plans joint productions or a merger. The reason to form an association is purely down to the costs of the increased levy on the companies' advertising revenue by the government and the cost of colour TV. The ITA stated there was no reason why the companies should not have talks about sensible economies that could be made, but would examine all details before any association were to be implemented.

July
3 July – Lulu the elephant runs amok on Blue Peter. The clip is subsequently repeated many times, becoming the archetypal British TV blooper.
12 July – The US sci-fi TV series Star Trek makes its debut on BBC1 beginning with the episode Where No Man Has Gone Before.
20–21 July – Live transmission from the Moon with the landing of Apollo 11 at 03:56 BST on 21 July, Neil Armstrong steps onto the surface. BBC television makes its first overnight broadcast to provide coverage. Footage of the event is reported to have been seen by 22 million UK viewers on 21 July (720 million worldwide).
27 July – First episode of The Morecambe & Wise Show, Series Two, on BBC2, the first scripted by Eddie Braben.

August
No events.

September
2 September – Release of The Stones in the Park, footage of a Rolling Stones concert given in London's Hyde Park in July and filmed by Granada Television.
21 September – Randall and Hopkirk (Deceased) premieres on ITV.
23 September – BBC2 show the TV Movie "Prescription: Murder", which sees the first appearance of the American detective Columbo, played by Peter Falk.
28 September – Debut of the American police drama Hawaii Five-O on ITV Yorkshire.  ITV Midlands and London regions broadcast the first episode a few days later on 3rd October.

October
4 October – The ITV Seven, a programme which shows live coverage of horse racing from racecourses around the UK, is first aired. The programme was an essential part of ITV's Saturday afternoon World of Sport show and continues until a few weeks before World of Sport ends in 1985.
5 October – The influential and surreal comedy sketch series Monty Python's Flying Circus airs its first episode on BBC1.
6 October – Chigley becomes the third and final programme of The Trumptonshire Trilogy on BBC1 to be shot in colour before the introduction of regular colour broadcasting on 15 November.

November
3 November – ITV airs the first edition of Coronation Street to be videotaped in colour, though it includes black-and-white inserts and titles, because colour transmissions have not yet officially begun (except for testing), most viewers will see it only in black-and-white. The 29 October episode, featuring a coach trip to the Lake District – had been scheduled for colour shooting, but suitable colour film stock could not be found so it was filmed in black-and-white.
15 November – Regular colour broadcasting is introduced to BBC1 and ITV.
16 November – The first episode of Clangers, a stop-motion animated programme for children, is broadcast on BBC1. 
19 November – The Benny Hill Show premieres on ITV.
20 November – The first episode of BBC sitcom Dad's Army to be broadcast in colour is Branded, the favourite of co-writer Jimmy Perry.
21 November – The controversial London Weekend Television comedy Curry and Chips begins airing. The programme is the first LWT comedy to have been broadcast in colour. It is pulled off air after six episodes following a ruling by the ITA that it is racist.
24 November – Coronation Street first officially transmitted in colour, according to its archivist Daran Little, but the 17 November episode may have been the first.

December
13 December
Scottish Television starts broadcasting in colour from the Black Hill transmitter.
Southern Television starts broadcasting in colour from the transmitters of Rowridge and Dover.
24 December – ITV show the first of several Christmas television comedy sketch shows with Carry On Christmas.
25 December – BBC1 debut Morecambe & Wise's long-running annual Christmas Day special The Morecambe & Wise Christmas Show.

Unknown 
Soul Limbo by Booker T. & the M.G.'s becomes the new theme tune for the BBC's cricket coverage.

Debuts

BBC1
2 January – Holiday (1969–2007)
14 January – Scobie in September (1969)
14 April – The Liver Birds (1969, 1971–1979, 1996)
5 April – As Good Cooks Go (1969–1970)
20 April – The Elusive Pimpernel (1969)
22 April – The Prior Commitment (1969)
12 July – Star Trek (1966–1969)
17 August – Dombey and Son (1969)
8 September – Counterstrike (1969)
9 September 
 Decidedly Dusty (1969)
 Nationwide (1969–1983)
17 September – Up Pompeii! (1969–1970; 1975, 1991)
22 September – A Handful of Thieves (1969)
5 October – Monty Python's Flying Circus (1969–1974)
6 October – The Trumptonshire Trilogy: Chigley (1969)
7 October – Mary, Mungo and Midge (1969)
16 November 
Clangers (1969–1974, 2015–present)
 Special Project Air (1969)
 17 November 
 Pegasus (1969)
 Take Three Girls (1969–1971)
19 November – The Doctors  (1969–1971)
20 November – Softly, Softly: Taskforce (1969–1976)
23 November – Paul Temple  (1969–1971)
15 December – The Battle of St George Without (1969)
Unknown – Wacky Races (1968–1969)

BBC2
25 January – The Possessed (1969)
17 February – The High Chaparral (1967–1971)
27 January – Where Was Spring? (1969–1970)
23 February - Civilisation (1969)
8 March – Imperial Palace (1969)
14 March – Q (1969–1982)
5 April – The Way We Live Now (1969)
10 May – Sinister Street (1969)
12 May – The Gnomes of Dulwich (1969)
3 June – W. Somerset Maugham (1969–1970)
23 July – Pot Black (1969–1986, 1990–1993, 2005–2008)
6 September – Review (1969–1972) (Art & Anthology series)
18 September – Plays of Today (1969)
27 September – The First Churchills (1969)
23 October – Canterbury Tales (1969)

ITV
1 January – The Life and Times of Lord Mountbatten (1969)
3 January – Spider-Man (1967-1970)
6 January – Mr. Digby Darling (1969–1971)
7 January – Junior Showtime (1969–1974)
10 January 
 The Corbett Follies (1969)
 The Fossett Saga (1969)
11 January – ITV Saturday Night Theatre (1969–1974)
12 January – Complete and Utter History of Britain (1969)
17 January – The Inside Man (1969)
18 January – The Saturday Crowd (1969)
9 February – This Is Tom Jones (1969–1971)
18 February – Two in Clover (1969–1970)
28 February – On the Buses (1969–1973)
9 March – Department S (1969–1970)
3 April – John Browne's Body (1969)
4 April – Castle Haven (1969–1970)
8 April – Judge Dee (1969)
11 April 
 Big Breadwinner Hog (1969)
 Hark at Barker (1969–1970)
15 April – Jokers Wild (1969–1974)
19 April – Galton and Simpson Comedy (1969)
23 April – The Mind of Mr. J.G. Reeder (1969–1971)
30 April –  Sez Les (1969–1976)
20 May – Fraud Squad (1969–1970)
21 May – The Tingaree Affair (1969)
6 June – The Gold Robbers' (1969)
18 June – The Main Chance (1969–1975)
3 July – Join Jim Dale (1969)
10 July – The Incredible Adventures of Professor Branestawm (1969)
12 July – Doctor in the House (1969–1970)
12 August – The Best Things in Life (1969–1970)
17 August – Stars on Sunday (1969–1979)
19 August – Who-Dun-It (1969)
5 September – The Contenders (1969)
15 September – Dear Mother...Love Albert (1969–1972)
16 September – Hadleigh (1969–1976)
17 September – Special Branch (1969–1974)
19 September – Parkin's Patch (1969–1970)
21 September 
The Flaxton Boys (1969–1973)
Randall and Hopkirk (Deceased) (1969–1970)
The Secret Service (1969)
 Strange Report (1969–1970)
23 September – The Dustbinmen (1969–1970)
28 September – Hawaii Five-O (1968–1980)
2 October – Girls About Town (1969–1971)
4 October – ITV Racing (1969–1985', 2017–present)
10 October – Ours Is a Nice House (1969–1970)
5 November – Lift Off with Ayshea (1969–1974)
18 November 
 Happy Ever After (1969–1970)
 Cribbins (1969–1970)
19 November 
 This Is Your Life (1955–1964, 1969–2003)
 The Benny Hill Show (1969–1989)
21 November – Curry and Chips (1969)
21 December – The Owl Service (1969–1970) 
26 December 
 The Engelbert Humperdinck Show (1969–1970)
 It's Tommy Cooper (1969–1971)
30 December – A Present for Dickie (1969–1970)
Unknown – Wheel of Fortune (1969–1971)

Continuing television shows
1920sBBC Wimbledon (1927–1939, 1946–2019, 2021–2024)

1930s
The Boat Race (1938–1939, 1946–2019) BBC Cricket (1939, 1946–1999, 2020–2024)

1940sCome Dancing (1949–1998)

1950sAndy Pandy (1950–1970, 2002–2005)Watch with Mother (1952–1975) The Good Old Days (1953–1983)Panorama (1953–present)Dixon of Dock Green (1955–1976)Crackerjack (1955–1984, 2020–present)Opportunity Knocks (1956–1978, 1987–1990)This Week (1956–1978, 1986–1992)Armchair Theatre (1956–1974)What the Papers Say (1956–2008)The Sky at Night (1957–present)Blue Peter (1958–present)Grandstand (1958–2007)

1960sCoronation Street (1960–present)Songs of Praise (1961–present)Z-Cars (1962–1978)Animal Magic (1962–1983)Doctor Who (1963–1989, 1996, 2005–present)World in Action (1963–1998)The Wednesday Play (1964–1970)Top of the Pops (1964–2006)Match of the Day (1964–present)Crossroads (1964–1988, 2001–2003)Play School (1964–1988)Mr. and Mrs. (1965–1999)Not Only... But Also (1965–1970)World of Sport (1965–1985)Sportsnight (1965–1997)All Gas and Gaiters (1966–1971)Jackanory (1965–1996, 2006)It's a Knockout (1966–1982, 1999–2001)The Money Programme (1966–2010)Not in Front of the Children (1967–1970)Never Mind the Quality, Feel the Width (1967–1971)Callan (1967–1972)The Golden Shot (1967–1975)Playhouse (1967–1982)Me Mammy (1968–1971)Please Sir! (1968–1972)Father, Dear Father (1968–1973)Dad's Army (1968–1977)Magpie (1968–1980)The Big Match (1968–2002)

Ending this year
9 February – The Saint (1962–1969)
30 April – The Champions (1968–1969)
14 May – Do Not Adjust Your Set (1967–1969)
21 May – The Avengers (1961–1969)
13 November – Softly, Softly (1966–1969)
28 November – The Newcomers (1965–1969)
26 December - Curry and Chips (1969)
29 December – The Trumptonshire Trilogy (1966–1969)
UnknownMarket in Honey Lane (1967–1969)Journey to the Unknown (1968–1969)Strange Report (1968–1969)

Births
 21 January – Hardeep Singh Kohli, comedian, writer and television presenter 
 22 January – Olivia d'Abo, English actress
 23 March – Richard Cadell, children's television presenter and magician (Sooty)
 4 April – Karren Brady, sporting executive, television broadcaster, newspaper columnist, author and novelist
 27 April – Tess Daly, British television presenter.
 15 May – Craig Oliver, journalist, television media executive and government special adviser
 10 June – Jane Hill, journalist and newsreader
 20 July – Gillian Joseph, newscaster
 31 July - Ben Chaplin, actor
 21 August – Julie Etchingham, journalist and newsreader
 25 September – Catherine Zeta-Jones, Welsh actress
 2 October – Natasha Little, actress
 5 October – Andrea McLean, television presenter
 16 October – Suzanne Virdee, newsreader on Midlands Today 
 13 November – Gerard Butler, Scottish actor
 19 December – Richard Hammond, British TV presenter

Deaths
 25 March – Billy Cotton, entertainer & bandleader (Wakey Wakey Tavern''), aged 69

See also
 1969 in British music
 1969 in British radio
 1969 in the United Kingdom
 List of British films of 1969

References